The Coupe de la Ligue is an annual League cup competition for French men's handball professional clubs. Organized by the Ligue Nationale de Handball, it first took place in 2002. 

Montpellier Handball is the competition's most successful club as of 2019 with ten titles, followed by Paris Saint-Germain Handball with three.

Champions

Winners by season

Performances 

 Legend :  10 cups won ; (T) : title holder

References

See also 
 LNH
 Division 1
 Coupe de France
 Trophée des Champions
 Coupe de la Ligue (women)

Handball competitions in France
Recurring sporting events established in 2002